Paper Birds is a 2010 Spanish drama film directed by Emilio Aragón Álvarez, starring Imanol Arias. The film tells the story of a group of vaudeville artists in the hard times after the Spanish Civil War.

Plot
Jorge and Enrique are two performers in post-Civil War Spain who adopt an orphan child called Miguel. With a variety company that travels around the country, Jorge and Enrique see the horrors left by the war, while Nationalists watch Jorge and the rest of the company, suspecting that some of them collaborate with the Republicans opposing Franco's regime.

Cast
 Imanol Arias as Jorge del Pino.
 Lluís Homar as Enrique Corgo.
 Roger Príncep as Miguel Puertas Maldonado.
 Carmen Machi as Rocío Moliner.
 Fernando Cayo as Capitán Montero.
 Diego Martin as Teniente Quiroga.
 José Ángel Egido as Ricardo Ubieto.

See also
 List of Spanish films of 2010

References

External links

 Film Website

2010 drama films
2010 films
Films scored by Emilio Aragón
Spanish drama films
2010s Spanish-language films
2010s Spanish films